Rhaetulus crenatus is a beetle of the Family Lucanidae.

External links

Photos of Rhaetulus crenatus

Lucaninae
Beetles described in 1871